Subtle Ways is the first studio album released by Maktub.  It was voted 1999 Northwest soul album of the year by the Grammy Association and Billboard Magazine called it "fresh and original."

Track listing
  "Intuition"  – 5:29
  "Love Me Like Before"  – 4:41
  "Just Can't Make It"  – 3:54
  "For Perfection"  – 3:53
  "Lies"  – 2:45 
  "Dichotomy"  – 5:35 
  "First Time"  – 5:07 
  "Believe"  – 6:46  
  "Twilight"  – 3:04 
  "Internal Light"  – 13:43 
  "Subtle Ways"  – 5:19

Maktub albums
1999 albums